Cedric O'Neal (born January 29, 1994) is an American football running back for the Jousters of The Spring League. He was signed by the Philadelphia Eagles after going undrafted in the 2016 NFL Draft. He played college football at Valdosta State.

Professional career

Philadelphia Eagles
O'Neal was signed on May 5, 2016 by the Philadelphia Eagles as an undrafted free agent. He was waived on August 21, 2016 but was re-signed on August 29, only to be waived on September 3, 2016.

Buffalo Bills
O'Neal was signed by the Buffalo Bills on December 15, 2016. He signed a reserve/future contract with the Bills on January 2, 2017. On August 29, 2017, he was released by the Bills.

The Spring League
O'Neal was selected by the Jousters of The Spring League during its player selection draft on October 10, 2020.

References

Living people
1994 births
Players of American football from Georgia (U.S. state)
People from Dublin, Georgia
American football running backs
Valdosta State Blazers football players
Philadelphia Eagles players
Buffalo Bills players
The Spring League players